Jacqueline Netter-Minne-Guerroudj (27 April 1919 – 18 January 2015) was a Frenchwoman condemned to death as an accomplice of 
Fernand Iveton during the Algerian War. She was never executed, partly due to a campaign on her behalf conducted by Simone de Beauvoir.

She was born to a well-off bourgeois family of Alsatian Jews in Rouen in 1919. She arrived in Algeria in 1948 as the wife of Pierre Minne, a professor of philosophy. She remarried in 1950 to Abdelkader Guerroudj (nicknamed "Djilali"), an activist in the FLN. On 4 December 1957 Guerroudj's daughter by her first marriage, Danièle Minne, was sentenced to 7 years in prison by a tribunal for juveniles. Guerroudj died on 18 January 2015 in Algiers, Algeria.

Published works

References 

1919 births
2015 deaths
People from Rouen
People of the Algerian War
Women in war in France
Women in warfare post-1945
20th-century French women politicians